Belle Plaine is a historic farm property at 2488 South United States Route 15 in rural Madison County, Virginia, south of Locust Dale. The main farmhouse is a five-bay two-story frame structure, to which is attached a somewhat older log structure, finished like the main block in wooden clapboards. It is believed that the log portion is one of the oldest surviving structures in the county. The property illustrates the changing trends of agricultural use over more than two centuries.

It was listed on the National Register of Historic Places in 2016.

References

Historic districts in Virginia
Houses on the National Register of Historic Places in Virginia
Farms on the National Register of Historic Places in Virginia
Federal architecture in Virginia
Houses completed in 1800
Houses in Madison County, Virginia
National Register of Historic Places in Madison County, Virginia
1760 establishments in Virginia